KLKK (103.7 FM, "The Fox") is a classic rock formatted broadcast radio station licensed to Clear Lake, Iowa, serving Clear Lake, Mason City and all of North Iowa and Southern Minnesota. KLKK is owned and operated by North Iowa Broadcasting.

History
KLKK was launched on August 1, 1990.

The station was initially launched on February 1, 1978, under the call letters KZEV.

Transmission Location
The KLKK transmitter is located right off 34th St. Se, just south of Mason City.

Programming
The station broadcasts a Classic Rock format with many AOR selections as well.  Its staff includes James Shaman, Mark Skaar, Harry O'Neal and Rob Getz.

Syndicated programming is also heard on The Fox, with the station airing Bob and Tom in the mornings, as well as The Tour Bus, Chop Shop, Rockin' 70s and 80s with Xander, Time Warp, The Bluesmobile, Live In Concert and Floydian Slip.

Broadcast Signal
The KLKK signal reaches from Algona to Cresco and Albert Lea, and south to Eldora.

References

External links
The Fox Online

LKK
Cerro Gordo County, Iowa
1990 establishments in Iowa